Carolyn Jean Chumney (born February 13, 1961) is an American lawyer and politician from the U.S. state of Tennessee. She served in the Tennessee House of Representatives from 1991 to 2003 and represented the fifth district (East Memphis and Midtown) on the Memphis, Tennessee City Council from 2004 to 2007.  Chumney came in second place in the Democratic primary for Shelby County mayor in 2002<ref>Wiley Henry, "A new sense of pride seen in Wharton victory," Tri-State Defender,(Memphis, TN), May 11-15-, 2002.''</ref> and within 7 points of being elected the first woman Memphis mayor in 2007. Chumney is a leading attorney taking the fight for election security to the U.S. Supreme Court and Congress. She is also the author of "The Arena: One Woman's Story" [Lady Justice Publishing 2021].

 Biography 

She attended school at:
Shady Grove School
White Station High School
The University of Memphis

As a Presidential Scholar, she earned her B.A. in economics and history with honors, magna cum laude, and was student government president (1982–83).

Chumney earned her Juris Doctor from the University of Memphis Law School in 1986, as a Herff Law Scholar. During law school she was the editor-in-chief of the law review.

As a trial attorney, Chumney began her private practice in 1987 at Glankler Brown law firm, where she later became a partner. Now she has her own law office in the White Station Tower. In 2001, she was honored by the Association for Women Attorneys for outstanding achievements in and for the legal profession.

House and legislation
From her election to the Tennessee House of Representatives in 1990, over thirteen years Carol rose to various leadership positions, including chair of the House Children & Family Affairs Standing Committee, House Majority Whip, and chair of the Shelby County delegation. She passed the child care reform law as reported in Time magazine, The New York Times, and statewide news publications. She also secured the $200,000 state grant to create the UT Memphis Center for Women's Health.

 Acclamations 
Chumney has been recognized for her leadership with awards
Tennessee Trial Lawyer's Consumer Protection Award (1995)
Tennessee Citizen Action Leadership Award (1995)
Tennessee Task Force Against Domestic Violence (1996)
Tennessee Association for Education of Young Children
University of Tennessee Health Science Leadership Award (2001)
Tennessee Sierra Club (2001)
Tennessee Development District Association Legislator of the Year Award (2003)
National Democratic Leadership Council's A100 New Democrats to Watch (2003)Memphis Woman Magazine 50 Women Who Make a Difference (2003)

She created and hosts Tennessee Lookout'', a public information show on the Library Channel 18.

References 

1961 births
Living people
Politicians from Memphis, Tennessee
University of Memphis alumni
Women state legislators in Tennessee
Democratic Party members of the Tennessee House of Representatives
Tennessee city council members
Tennessee lawyers
American women lawyers
Women city councillors in Tennessee
21st-century American women